Thirunallar is a small town in Karaikal, India, in the Union Territory of Puducherry, and can be reached by road from the town of Karaikal, an enclave which lies within the neighbouring state of Tamil Nadu. Thirunallar contains the shrine of Lord Sani (Saturn), Tirunallar Saniswaran Temple within the temple dedicated to Lord Darbharanyeswaran, a form of Lord Shiva.

God sri Shaneeshwaran
This is the only temple that is dedicated to Lord Shani (Saneeswaran, in Tamil). Whenever (planet) Saturn transits from one zodiac sign to another (an occurrence roughly every 2.5 years), millions throng this shrine for worship. The legendary King Nala is said to have been relieved of his afflictions caused by the malefic influence of Saturn, after worship in this temple. Of the numerous theertams (sacred bathing places), the Nala theertam is the most important one. It is believed that by bathing here, one washes off all the kinds of misfortunes and afflictions caused by one's past of karmas (in terms of deities, Lord Shani or Saturn is said to be the dispenser of karmas (both good and bad), but also one whose Grace, particularly at this shrine, can dispel bad karmas or, at least, make them bearable)

Literature
The Story of the Pachchai Padigam (In the Tamil language, Pachchai = evergreen, Padigam = decadal verse)
Thirunallar possesses one of the greatest pieces of Tamil hymnal literature called "Pachchai Padigam". This hymn is written in praise of Lord Darbharanyeswaran.

Legend behind the temple
Legend had it that in the 7th century C.E. (Common Era), in Madurai, the capital of the Pandian Kingdom, the king Ninra-seer-nedumaran converted to Jainism. During that time, Jainism was spreading its influence
in South India. Soon, all but his queen Mangaiyarkarasi and his minister Kulacchirai Nayanar - both staunch Saivaites (worshippers of Lord Shiva) had embraced Jainism, forsaking the old religion. This caused immense agony to the queen and the minister who were anxious to reclaim both king and kingdom back into the fold of the traditional religion (Saivism).

To these two grief-stricken individuals, came the news of  camping of saint Thirugnana Sambandar at Vedaranyam.  Having heard of the miracles performed by this young Saivite saint in Thanjavur district, they sent an urgent invitation to him to visit Madurai and extricate the king and his subjects from the clutches of Jainism.

The arrival of the Saivate saint irked the Jains, who are said to have then set fire to his holy dwelling. But by his yogic powers, Sambandar had the heat transferred to the king, who consequently suffered in agony. Upon the Queen's request, the young saint then sang the Padigam  'Mandiramavadu Neeru' and sprinkled a few grains of holy ash on the right side of the king's body to alleviate the pain. In contest, the Jains in turn chanted the Aruga Mantra (Jain Mantra) and stroked the left side of the king's person with peacock feathers, but it only aggravated the pain! In response to entreaties by the king and his ministers, Sambandar applied a few more grains of the sacred ash to the king's left side also. The poor Pandian monarch, who only a little while ago was the very picture of suffering, misery and distress, now smiled gaily and was free of his burns.

But the Jains challenged the Saivites further, asking that the Mantras of both religions be written on palm leaves and consigned to flames to see which one survived the ordeal of fire (thereby showing superiority over the other). The Jains first placed their palm leaf onto the fire but it was soon consumed by the flames. Saint Thirugnana Sambandar placed on the flames one leaf containing the forty-ninth Padigam of the Tevaram hymn which was sung at the shrine of Lord Darbharanyeswaran Shiva at Thirunallar. The leaf remained untouched by the flames and maintained its evergreen freshness, reestablishing Saivism as the true religion in Pandian capital. Hence the glory of the Thirunallar temple.

Etymology
The name ThiruNallar(u) is believed to represent the association of King Nala of the Nishadha country who was delivered from the bad effects of Shani (Saturn) by invoking the Lord's mercy here (Nala + Aru = Nallaru). The word "Aru"  here denotes "to heal" and the two words taken together means the place where Nala was redeemed from the (malefic) hold of Saturn through the Lord's Grace. Others are inclined to read the meaning 'between rivers' in the name Nal-Aru, as this place is situated amidst rivers Noolaru and Vanchiaru in the north, and Arasalaru in the south.

Transportation
ThiruNallar is located around 7 kilometer away from the district headquarter karaikal. It is well connected with karaikal and kumbakonam. There is no train service available to thirunallar but one can reach karaikal railway station which is located around 7 kilometer from temple.  Daily train services are available from karaikal railway station to Bangalore, Chennai, Ernakulam, Thanjavur, Trichy, and weekly train is available to Mumbai LT. A meter gauge (MG) train existed since French rule till late in the 20th century, there are plans to revive this old Karaikal- Peralam Junction line which runs via Kovilpatthu , Thirunallar, Selur, Pattucoudy, and Ambaragathur.

Devotees coming from Chennai, Andhra Pradesh can easily reach karaikal via chidambaram and Sirkali. Frequent bus service available from chidambram to karaikal bus stand.

Trichy is the nearest airport which is located around 154 kilometer from Thirunallar temple. One can reach temple from trichy via Thanjavur, kumbakonam by train, bus, car and other motor vehicle.

External links
 https://thirunallarutemple.org/e-seva/ (To order online puja at Thirunallar temple)
 https://thirunallarutemple.org
 http://www.chennaivision.com/?page_id=413  (live Webcasting of Sanipeyarchi Festival on 21 December 2011 )
 http://karaikal.gov.in/SDS/shistory.htm (Information about Thirunallar at the Website of the Collectorate of Karaikal)
 https://templeknowledge.com/about-thirunallar-temple/ (Shrine in Thirunallar)
 http://www.pondyonline.com/user/NavagrahaTemples/Saturn.aspx
 https://web.archive.org/web/20090928033851/http://www.thirunallarsaneeswaran.org/  (live Webcasting of Sanipeyarchi on 26th Sept 2009 )
 Pandyan Dynasty

References

 
 
 
 
 
 

Cities and towns in Karaikal district